Harsha Rajapaksha (born 8 April 1995) is a Sri Lankan cricketer. He made his first-class debut for Sri Lanka Ports Authority Cricket Club in the 2015–16 Premier League Tournament on 26 December 2015.

References

External links
 

1995 births
Living people
Sri Lankan cricketers
Monaragala District cricketers
Sri Lanka Ports Authority Cricket Club cricketers